Suranash (Suranaş) is a rural locality (a selo) in Turochaksky District, the Altai Republic, Russia. The population was 31 as of 2016. There is 1 street.

Geography 
Suranash is located 103 km east of Turochak (the district's administrative centre) by road.

References 

Rural localities in Turochaksky District